Ronald Lising is a Filipino international lawn bowler.

Bowls career
In 2005, Lising won the gold medal in the singles event at the 2005 Southeast Asian Games in Angeles City.

He won a fours bronze medal (with Christopher Dagpin, Angelo Morales and Leo Carreon) at the 2009 Asia Pacific Bowls Championships, held in Kuala Lumpur.

Lising was selected as part of the five man team by the Philippines for the 2020 World Outdoor Bowls Championship, which was due to be held in the Gold Coast, Australia.

In 2023, he won the pairs gold medal (with Leo Carreon) at the 14th Asian Lawn Bowls Championship in Kuala Lumpur.

References

Living people
Filipino male lawn bowls players
Year of birth missing (living people)
Southeast Asian Games medalists in lawn bowls
Competitors at the 2005 Southeast Asian Games
Competitors at the 2017 Southeast Asian Games
Southeast Asian Games gold medalists for the Philippines